The Department of Women & Child Development & Social Welfare is a West Bengal government department. It is an interior ministry mainly responsible for the administration of the development of women and child and social welfare.

List of Ministers
 Sabitri Mitra
 Shashi Panja

Introduction
The Department of Women and Child Development and Social Welfare, Government of West Bengal, is responsible for the development of women and child and social welfare in the state of West Bengal. The Department of Women Development and Social Welfare works towards the protection, equity and inclusion of populations that have been historically oppressed, neglected or excluded from development because of their gender, age, disability or situation. This includes women, senior citizens and other marginalized populations such as persons with disabilities, transgender persons, homeless persons and persons with drug / alcohol addiction.

Controller Boards

Directorate and Wings
 Directorate of Social Welfare
 Directorate of Child Rights and Trafficking
 Directorate of Integrated Child Development Services
 State Commission for Persons with Disabilities
 State Commission for Protection of Child Rights
 State Commission for Women
 Office of the Controller for Vagrancy
 West Bengal Social Welfare Board
 West Bengal Transgender Development Board
 West Bengal Women Development Undertaking
 State Resource Center for Women
 State Child Protection Society
 West Bengal Task Force and RRRI of Women and Children
 Kanyashree Prakalpa

References

Government departments of West Bengal